The 2010 Austrian Figure Skating Championships took place between 10 and 12 December 2009 at the Tiroler Wasserkraftarena in Innsbruck. Skaters competed in the disciplines of men's singles, ladies' singles, and ice dancing on the senior level. The results were used to choose the Austrian teams to the 2010 World Championships and the 2010 European Championships.

The Junior Championships were held immediately prior to the Senior championships in the same location and arena, between 8 and 10 December.

The senior compulsory dance was the Tango Romantica and the junior was the Westminster Waltz.

Senior results

Men

Ladies

Ice dancing

Junior results

Men

Ladies

Pairs

Ice dancing

External links
 Staatsmeister 2010
 2010 Austrian Championships results
 2010 Austrian Junior Championships results

Austrian Figure Skating Championships
Austrian Figure Skating Championships, 2010
2009 in figure skating
Austrian Figure Skating Championships, 2010
2009 in Austrian sport